WeSC (short for "We are the Superlative Conspiracy") is a Swedish clothing brand that is primarily influenced by skateboarding and snowboarding. The company's head office is in Stockholm and employs between 51 and 200 staff members.  The company's CEO is Joseph Janus.

History
Founded in 1999, the brand first garnered attention by sponsoring Swedish underground artists, musicians and skateboarders, and did not engage in any other marketing. Swedish hip hop acts Looptroop and Timbuktu were among the first to be sponsored by WESC, contributing to the development of an alternative image that turned out to be very popular with young Swedish consumers who were critical of mainstream companies.

Retail outlets
In 2009, WeSC signed an exclusive retail deal with Oved Apparel Corp for the latter to oversee all WeSC stores in the United States, with the exception of the New York City and Los Angeles locations. The company opened a concept store in Singapore in early 2012.

We Activists
As of July 2014, WESC maintains a group of sponsored individuals, skateboarders and musicians who are called "We Activists" by the company.

People
Adalbert
Stretch Armstrong
Axwell
Ingemar Backman
Mark Baines
Tim Derrek
Ray Barbee
Bloody Beetroots
Sean Black
JTech145  
Mitchy Bwoy
Chords
Diskjokke
Mika Edin
Love Eneroth
Benny Fairfax
FrenchFred
Foyone
Amy Gunther
Andrew Hardingham
Mercedes Helnwein
Rory Herrmann
DEON
Fredrik Johansson
Kaskade
Tuukka Korhonen
Jörgen Kruth
Lady Tigra
Jason Lee
Ed Leigh
Nicole Le Moine
Lil Buck
Lisa Loud
Tony Manfre
Rae Martini
Spoek Mathambo 
Darrell Mathes
Kim Matulova
Sarah Meurle
Oscar Meza
Russ Milligan
Carlo Mondavi
Jukki Oksanen
Pase Rock
Chris Pastras
Mikael Persbrandt
Clint Peterson
Petter
Vanessa Prager
Giovanni Reda
Tom Remillard
Beth Riesgraf
Mathias Ringström
Chad Robertson
Arto Saari
Ricky Sandström
Frankie Shin
Signe Siemson
Sleepy
Danijel Stankovic
Stash
Peter Stormare
Pär Strömberg
Marcel Struwer
SuperBlast
Timbuktu
Wieger van Wageningen
Dely Bosch
Maxim Habanec
Jake Welch
Jonas Wiehager
Cooper Wilt
YONE
Shelly Zander

Groups
Looptroop Rockers
Millencolin
Steed Lord
Teddybears

Other
Superlative Conspiracy Magazine

WeActivists are defined by the company as "someone that is extremely good at what they do, world famous or totally unknown. A Weactivist is someone that has a streetwise mentality, blazing his, or her own path, with a humble persona. Essentially, they are an informal ambassador flying the flag of the Superlative Conspiracy in a variety of subcultures, such as skate, music, film and art. They are always a friend and never chosen at random."

See also
Theodor Dalenson

References

External links 
Official Sites
WeSC official site
WeSC Corporate site (Swedish)
WeSC official UK site

Clothing brands
Clothing brands of Sweden
Clothing companies of Sweden
Clothing companies established in 1999
Swedish brands
1999 establishments in Sweden